Daria Michalak née Zawistowska (born 12 December 1995) is a Polish handballer for Pogoń Baltica Szczecin and the Polish national team.

International honours
EHF Challenge Cup:
Finalist: 2015
Carpathian Trophy:
Winner: 2017

References

1995 births
Living people
Sportspeople from Szczecin
Polish female handball players
21st-century Polish women